San Damiano College is a Catholic secondary school located in Yarrabilba, a locality of Logan City, Queensland, Australia. After construction was completed in 2020, the school was opened for grade 7 students in February 2021. San Damiano College is administered by Brisbane Catholic Education.

References

External links

2021 establishments in Australia
Catholic secondary schools in Queensland
Educational institutions established in 2021
Private secondary schools in Queensland
Schools in Logan City